Quickville is a ghost town in Thomas County, Kansas, United States.  It is farm ground with no remaining structures.

History
Quickville was platted on June 27, 1887, by the Thomas County Land and Townsite Co.

It was issued a post office in 1880. The post office was discontinued in 1909.

References

Further reading

External links
 Thomas County maps: Current, Historic, KDOT

Former populated places in Thomas County, Kansas
Former populated places in Kansas